Roman Kazantsev (born 9 February 1965) is a Soviet rower. He competed in the men's coxed pair event at the 1988 Summer Olympics.

References

1965 births
Living people
Soviet male rowers
Olympic rowers of the Soviet Union
Rowers at the 1988 Summer Olympics
Place of birth missing (living people)